Lavender is a biweekly award-winning print and online magazine, part of Lavender Media, Inc., published in Minneapolis, Minnesota, for the LGBTQ+ community. Since 1995, Lavender Media, Inc. has been producing an award-winning glossy magazine and events aimed at the local, national and international lesbian, gay, bisexual, transgender, queer (LGBTQ) and LGBTQ-friendly audience. Lavender is published bi-weekly in print, online, iPad and smartphone editions, and connects our readers to current trends in cuisine, family, fashion, fitness, health, news, nightlife, travel and wedding style.. It is distributed free of charge in the Twin Cities of Minneapolis and St. Paul and in some other cities throughout Minnesota and western Wisconsin.

History
Founded in 1995 by George Holdgrafer and Stephen Rocheford, Lavender'''s mission is "to appeal to the greatest number of Minnesota LGBTQ+ readers, and direct them to [their] advertisers." Lavender published its 500th issue in June 2014.

In 2010, Lavender drew attention to Lutheran pastor Tom Brock who was privately homosexual as well as critical of allowing homosexuals joining the Lutheran clergy. Although Brock was put on leave, he was not fired from his position.

In 2017, Stephen Rocheford, CEO of Lavender, publicly voiced criticism of the exclusion of police officers from the 2017 Twin Cities Pride festival parade.

 Controversies 
In 2016, after the Orlando nightclub shooting, Lavender editors wrote an article accused of anti-Muslim bias. The opposition to the articles organized a Change.org petition aimed at Stephen Rocheford for singling out Islam as a source of violence.

 Awards 
In 2016, Lavender'' was named Magazine of the Year by the Minnesota Magazine & Publishing Association (MMPA). It has also received more than 100 MMPA awards in the categories of overall excellence, best digital media, best internet site, best director, best single cover, best feature article, best regular column, best single topic, best how-to article, best use of visuals, best redesign, best media kit, and best editor's or publisher's editorial.

References

External links

 Lavender Magazine website

Biweekly magazines published in the United States
Free magazines
LGBT in Minnesota
LGBT-related magazines published in the United States
Magazines established in 1995
Magazines published in Minnesota
Mass media in Minneapolis–Saint Paul